The Institute of Mathematics of the National Academy of Sciences of Belarus was founded in 1959. It is headquartered in Minsk, with a division in Gomel.

Departments
 Algebra
 Control Process Theory
 Computational Mathematics and Mathematical Modelling
 Differential Equations
 Finite Croup Theory  and Applications (in Gomel) 
 Combinatorial Models and Algorithms
 Mathematical Theory of Systems
 Mathematical Physics
 Nonlinear and Stochastic Analysis
 Parallel Computing Processes

External links
Official website

Research institutes in Belarus
Mathematical institutes
Universities and institutes established in the Soviet Union
Research institutes in the Soviet Union
1959 establishments in the Soviet Union
Research institutes established in 1959